Eero Antikainen (5 January 1906 - 29 January 1960) was a Finnish sawmill worker, trade union leader and politician, born in Vehmersalmi. He served as Deputy Minister of Transport and Public Works from 26 April to 29 August 1958. He was a member of the Parliament of Finland from 1951 to 1955, representing the Social Democratic Party of Finland (SDP). He later joined the Social Democratic Union of Workers and Smallholders (TPSL). He was the chairman of the Finnish Federation of Trade Unions (SAK) from 1954 to 1958.

References

1906 births
1960 deaths
People from Kuopio
People from Kuopio Province (Grand Duchy of Finland)
Social Democratic Party of Finland politicians
Social Democratic Union of Workers and Smallholders politicians
Ministers of Transport and Public Works of Finland
Members of the Parliament of Finland (1951–54)
Members of the Parliament of Finland (1954–58)